France 3 Provence-Alpes is a regional television service, part of the France 3 network. It serves the Provence-Alpes-Côte d'Azur region from its headquarters in Marseille and secondary production centre in Antibes, along with newsrooms in Toulon and Nice. France 3 Provence-Alpes produces regional news, sport, features and entertainment programming.

History 
RTF Télé-Marseille began broadcasting on 20 September 1954. In 1964, RTF was replaced with ORTF by the government, with RTF Télé-Marseille becoming ORTF  Marseille Provence. After the de-establishment of ORTF on 6 January 1975, ORTF Télé-Marseille became FR3 Méditerranée. Following the establishment of France Télévisions on 7 September 1992, FR3 Méditerranée was rebranded France 3 Méditerranée.

Programming

News
France 3 Méditerranée produces daily news programmes for its two sub-regions - programming for the Côte d'Azur sub-region is produced in Antibes, with the Provence-Alpes sub-region receiving programming from Marseille. Each sub-region produces a 27-minute bulletin (midi-pile) at 1200 CET during 12|13 and a main half-hour news broadcast at 1900 during 19|20. Three 10-minute local bulletins for the Marseille, Côte Varoise and Nice areas are broadcast during 19|20 at 1845 CET.

On 5 January 2009, a 5-minute late night bulletin was introduced, forming part of Soir 3.

On some weekends and holiday periods, as well as during major events, the Côte d'Azur and Provence-Alpes news bulletins are combined into pan-regional Méditerranée editions.

See also 
 France 3 Côte d'Azur

External links 
 Official site 

03 France 3 Provence-Alpes
Television channels and stations established in 1954
Mass media in Marseille
Mass media in Antibes